Teakettle Junction is a road junction in Inyo County, California.

At the junction where the unimproved road from Ubehebe Crater meets roads to the Racetrack Playa and Hunter Mountain, there is a sign reading "Teakettle Junction." While the origin of the name is unknown, it has become a tradition for visitors to attach teakettles to the sign with messages written on them.  National Park Service rangers will sometimes remove a number of teakettles when there are too many.

The rock at the junction includes the bedrock sandstone of the Eureka Quartzite strata.

The quickest way to get to Tea Kettle Junction is to follow Scott's Castle Road from Stovepipe Wells. Turn left to Ubehebe Crater road at Grapevine Ranger Station and follow directions to Ubehebe Crater Road. The road is paved until this point. Then follow directions for Racetrack Playa. Tea Kettle Junction is about 20miles from here, and most of the travel will be through washboard. Travellers carry spare tires and extra gasoline on this journey as it is a less frequently travelled.

See also
Places of interest in the Death Valley area

References

Death Valley
Tourist attractions in Inyo County, California
Road junctions in the United States